Cheryl Lavoie is a politician in the province of New Brunswick, Canada. She was elected to the Legislative Assembly of New Brunswick in 2006 as the Liberal MLA for Nepisiguit. She was made minister of state for seniors and minister responsible for the Community Non-profit Organizations Secretariat in March 2010.

References

Living people
Women government ministers of Canada
Members of the Executive Council of New Brunswick
New Brunswick Liberal Association MLAs
Women MLAs in New Brunswick
Acadian people
21st-century Canadian politicians
21st-century Canadian women politicians
Year of birth missing (living people)